The 2003–04 William & Mary Tribe men's basketball team represented The College of William & Mary during the 2004–05 college basketball season. This was head coach Tony Shaver's first season at William & Mary after previously coaching at Hampden Sydney College. The Tribe competed in the Colonial Athletic Association and played their home games at Kaplan Arena. They finished the season 7–21, 4–14 in CAA play and lost in the quarterfinals of the 2004 CAA men's basketball tournament to Towson in the preliminary round. They did not participate in any post-season tournaments.

References

William and Mary Tribe
William & Mary Tribe men's basketball seasons
William and Mary Tribe
William and Mary Tribe